Domino Recording Company or simply Domino is a British independent record label based in London. There is also a wing of the label based in Brooklyn, New York that handles releases in the United States, as well as a German division called Domino Deutschland and a French division called Domino France. In addition, Stephen Pastel presides over the subsidiary label Geographic Music, which releases more 'unusual' music from Britain and outside of the Western world. In 2011, the company announced that it was beginning a book publishing division, The Domino Press.

History
Founded in 1993, by Laurence Bell and Jacqui Rice, the label's first release was the Sebadoh EP Rocking the Forest, licensed from Sub Pop records for release in the UK.  Many of the early releases were by American artists who in the US were signed to Drag City (Smog, Will Oldham, Royal Trux), a relationship which continues to this day. Success was not immediate, as labels such as Domino, who were releasing more established American rock and unusual British music, were marginalised during the Britpop era, but a steady stream of new signings gave the label increasing credibility. Recent high-profile releases from Anna Calvi, Franz Ferdinand, Arctic Monkeys, and The Kills have only acted as a catalyst to this, and Domino is now one of the longest running and most successful independent record labels in the UK.

2003 was the label's 10th anniversary. There were a number of new releases, as well as a compilation album and a series of gigs in London under the 'Worlds of Possibility' banner, to celebrate the label's first decade in October of that year.

Domino celebrated their first UK #1 album in October 2005 with Franz Ferdinand's You Could Have It So Much Better, and their first UK #1 single with Arctic Monkeys' "I Bet You Look Good on the Dancefloor" later that same month.

In March 2021, it was announced that seminal shoegaze band My Bloody Valentine had signed with the label. This announcement was accompanied by the first ever official digital release of the band's discography to streaming platforms.  

As well as new music, Domino have released compilations by British post-punk bands such as Orange Juice, Josef K, Fire Engines and Young Marble Giants.

Roster

Domino UK

Current artists

 About Group
 Alex G
 Alexis Taylor
 Alex Turner
 Animal Collective
 Anna Calvi
 Archie Bronson Outfit
 Arctic Monkeys
 Austra
 Lou Barlow
 Blood Orange / Lightspeed Champion
 Bob Moses
 Bonnie Prince Billy
 Buzzcocks
 Clinic
 The Count and Sinden
 Dan Deacon
 Dirty Projectors
 Ela Minus
 Fat White Family
 FFS
 Seamus Fogarty
 Four Tet
 Franz Ferdinand
 Frànçois & the Atlas Mountains
 Galaxie 500
 Georgia
Hard Feelings
 Hookworms
 Hot Chip
 Jon Hopkins
 Julia Holter
 Junior Boys
 The Kills
 King Creosote
 The Last Shadow Puppets
 Stephen Malkmus and the Jicks
 Malachai
 Max Tundra
 Cass McCombs
 Eugene McGuinness
 Middle Kids
 Juana Molina
 My Bloody Valentine
 Nérija
 One True Pairing
 Orange Juice
 Owen Pallett
 The Pastels
 Pavement
 Pram
 Protomartyr
 Psapp
 Quasi
 Real Estate
 Royal Trux
 Bill Ryder-Jones
 Sebadoh
 Sons and Daughters
 Sorry
 Spiral Stairs
 Superorganism
 Hayden Thorpe
 Tirzah
 To Rococo Rot
 Tricky
 Mr Twin Sister
 Villagers
 Patrick Watson
 Wet Leg
 Matthew E. White
 Robert Wyatt
 Wyatt, Atzmon & Stephen
 Xenoula
 James Yorkston

Former artists

 10,000 Things
 Adem
 Aerial M
 ...And You Will Know Us by the Trail of Dead
 The Beautiful New Born Children
 The Blueskins
 Bonde do Role
 Bowlfish
 Chief
 Cinema
 Clearlake
 Come
 Correcto
 Crescent
 Cindy Dall
 Deluxx Folk Implosion
 Director Sound
 Ducktails
 Matt Elliott
 Elliott Smith
 The Fall
 The Feelies
 Benjy Ferree* Benjy Ferree
 Fence Collective
 Fire Engines
 Fizzarum
 Flipper
 Flying Saucer Attack
 The Folk Implosion
 The For Carnation
 Fridge
 Ganger
 Gastr del Sol
 God's Eye
 Gummo (soundtrack)
 Neil Michael Hagerty
 HMS Ginafore
 Hood
 James Yorkston & The Big Fancy Players
 Josef K
 Juana Molina
 Kieran Hebden & Steve Reid
 Leatherface
 Jason Loewenstein
 Lone Pigeon
 Loose Fur
 The Magnetic Fields
 Matt Sweeney & Bonnie Prince Billy
 Mazey Fade
 Midnight Funk Association
 Barbara Morgenstern
 Mouse on Mars
 Movietone
 Neutral Milk Hotel
 Jim O'Rourke
 Will Oldham
 Pajo
 Palace / Palace Brothers / Palace Music / Palace Songs (Will Oldham, AKA Bonnie "Prince" Billy)
 Pavement (band)
 Papa M
 The Pictish Trail
 Plush
 Policecat
 Preston School of Industry
 The Pyramids
 Quickspace
 Quickspace Supersport
 Sandy Dirt
 Scarce
 Schlammpeitziger
 Sentridoh
 Silver Jews
 Smudge
 Steve Reid Ensemble
 Superchunk
 Tele:Funken
 The Television Personalities
 Telstar Ponies
 Terry Funken
 Test Icicles
 The Third Eye Foundation
 The Triffids
 These New Puritans
 u.n.p.o.c.
 V-Twin
 Townes Van Zandt
 Von Südenfed
 Weird War
 Wild Beasts
 Yo Majesty
 James Yorkston and The Athletes
 Young Marble Giants

Domino USA

 Adem
 Alex G
 Animal Collective
 Benjy Ferree
 Caribou
 Cass McCombs
 Chief
 Clearlake
 Clinic
 Correcto
 Dirty Projectors
 Four Tet
 Franz Ferdinand
 Future Pilot AKA
 Juana Molina
 Julia Holter
 Junior Boys
 Lightspeed Champion
 Malachai
 Melody's Echo Chamber
 Middle Kids
 Neutral Milk Hotel
 Night Moves
 The Notwist
 Orange Juice
 Panda Bear
 The Pastels
 Porches
 The Range
 Sasami
 Sebadoh
 Sons and Daughters
 To Rococo Rot
 Twin Sister
 Ulrich Schnauss
 White Lung
 Yo Majesty
 James Yorkston and the Athletes
 Your Friend

Domino imprints

Geographic Music

Bill Wells Trio
 Empress
 Future Pilot AKA
 International Airport
 Kama Aina
 Lightships
 Maher Shalal Hash Baz
 Nagisa ni te
 September Collective
 Spinning Coin
 Teenage Fanclub & Jad Fair
 The Royal We

Double Six Records

Bill Ryder-Jones
Jon Hopkins and King Creosote
Bill Wells
The Child of Lov
John Cale
Spiritualized
Steve Mason
Petite Noir
She & Him
Trailer Trash Tracys
Twin Sister
George FitzGerald

Weird World
How to Dress Well
Peaking Lights
Smith Westerns
Washed Out
Melody's Echo Chamber
Richard Dawson
Wilma Archer
 Silicon
Jaakko Eino Kalevi

Rekords Rekords
Queens of the Stone Age
Mondo Generator
Alain Johannes
Mini Mansions

See also
 List of record labels
 List of independent UK record labels

References

External links

British independent record labels
Record labels established in 1993
Indie rock record labels